Acrocercops brachyglypta is a moth of the family Gracillariidae, known from Java, Indonesia, as well as Samoa and the Solomon Islands. It was described by E. Meyrick in 1931.

References

brachyglypta
Moths of Asia
Moths described in 1931